Alexey Yuryevich Kurbatov (born 9 May 1994) is a Russian cyclist, who most recently rode for UCI Professional Continental team . He participated in the 2016 Olympics road race.

References

External links
 
 
 
 

1994 births
Living people
Russian male cyclists
Cyclists at the 2016 Summer Olympics
Olympic cyclists of Russia